Y is the debut novel of American-Canadian writer Marjorie Celona. It was published in 2012 by Hamish Hamilton.

Plot
Shortly after being born on Vancouver Island, Shannon is abandoned in front of a YMCA and discovered by Vaughn, an exercise fiend who has arrived at the YMCA before it's opened. Shannon is moved to a few foster homes before finally being adopted by a single mother named Miranda in order to be a sister to her only daughter, Lydia-Rose. Though Miranda tries to be a good parent to Shannon, Shannon feels like an outsider in her relationship with Miranda and Lydia-Rose. As she grows older amblyopia in one of her eyes causes her to go blind in one eye and her strange looks mean she is occasionally bullied. After she runs away to Vancouver and is brought back by the police, Shannon begins to search for her birth parents, encountering Vaughn along the way.

With help from a social worker Shannon is able to contact a man she believes is her biological father, Harrison Church. After contacting him by letter, Shannon learns that she was born the day after her half-brother, Eugene, died after ingesting a mixture of cough-syrup and cocaine while Harrison and her mother, Yula, were off getting high in the woods. Yula abandoned her in front of the YMCA knowing that she would have to give up custody of her child anyway after her son's death and not wanting her daughter to know about the things her parents had done.

Awards
Y won the Waterstones 11 literary prize and was a shortlisted nominee for the Center for Fiction's Flaherty-Dunnan First Novel Prize, the Amazon.ca First Novel Award and a longlisted nominee for the Scotiabank Giller Prize.

References

2012 Canadian novels
Novels set in British Columbia
2012 debut novels
Hamish Hamilton books